This is a list of medalists from the FIS Nordic World Ski Championships in ski jumping. Bold numbers in brackets denotes record number of victories in corresponding disciplines.

Men

Large hill individual
Debuted: 1925. Unofficial event: 1941.

The individual large hill is one of only three events that has been contested at every FIS Nordic World Ski Championships.

Medal table

Normal hill individual
Debuted: 1962.

Medal table

Large hill team
Unofficial first ever demonstration team event: 1978. Officially debuted: 1982.

1984 Extra World Championships in Engelberg, Switzerland as the team event was not on the program for the 1984 Winter Olympics in Sarajevo.
In 2013 Norway initially took the silver medal but were moved down to fourth place when it was discovered that Anders Bardal got too many points after his first jump.

Medal table

Normal hill team
Debuted: 2001. Not held: 2003. Resumed: 2005. Not held: 2007–2009. Resumed: 2011.

Medal table

Women

Normal hill individual
Debuted: 2009.

Medal table

Large hill individual
Debuted: 2021

Medal table

Normal hill team
Debuted: 2019.

Medal table

Mixed

Mixed team normal hill
Debuted: 2013.

Medal table

Medal table
Table updated after the 2023 Championships.

Most successful athletes (by number of victories)

Boldface denotes active ski jumpers and highest medal count among all ski jumpers (including these who not included in these tables) per type.

Men

All events

Individual events

Women

All events

Individual events

Best performers by country
Here are listed most successful ski jumpers in the history of each medal-winning national team – according to the gold-first ranking system and by total number of World Championships medals (one jumper if he holds national records in both categories or few jumpers if these national records belongs to different persons). If the total number of medals is identical, the gold, silver and bronze medals are used as tie-breakers (in that order). If all numbers are the same, the jumpers get the same placement and are sorted by the alphabetic order.

An asterisk (*) marks athletes who are the only representatives of their respective countries to win a medal.

See also
Ski jumping at the Winter Olympics
List of Olympic medalists in ski jumping
Ski jumping World Cup

References
FIS-ski.com
Sports123.com

Lists of ski jumping medalists